Edward Chester Barnard (1863–1921) was an American topographer. Born in New York City, he was a graduate of Columbia University (1884). He was the chief topographer of the United States and Canada boundary survey (1903–1915); U.S. Boundary Commissioner (1915–1921); and topographer with the United States Geological Survey (1884–1907). Mount Barnard in Glacier Bay National Park and Preserve was posthumously named in his honor by the International Boundary Commission.

References

1863 births
1921 deaths
American topographers
Columbia University alumni
United States Geological Survey personnel